Jane the Virgin is an American satirical romantic comedy-drama telenovela that premiered on The CW on October 13, 2014. The series was developed by Jennie Snyder Urman. The following is a list of characters who have appeared over the various seasons since the series' premiere.

Main characters

Overview

Notes

Jane Villanueva
Jane Gloriana Villanueva (Gina Rodriguez) is a devoted Catholic who has vowed to her grandmother, Alba, to preserve her virginity until marriage. She is engaged to Michael Cordero. Due to a mix-up at the gynecologist's clinic, Jane finds herself accidentally artificially inseminated with the sperm of Rafael Solano, who also happens to be the owner of the hotel at which Jane works. Jane's relationship with Michael begins to deteriorate as she grows closer to Rafael over the course of her pregnancy. The two soon enter into a relationship, but split shortly before the baby is born. Over the course of the first season, Jane also becomes acquainted with her father, telenovela star, Rogelio De La Vega, who was previously unaware of his daughter's existence. Jane gives birth to a son whom she and Rafael name Mateo (the name of her dead grandfather).

As Jane adjusts to life with a newborn, she decides to put her plan to become a teacher aside and pursue her dream of writing. Meanwhile, Rafael and Michael both try to win her back. She chooses neither for a while and enters into a brief relationship with her mentor, Jonathan Chavez. Jane also attempts to build a friendship with Rafael's ex-wife, Petra (who has meanwhile given birth to twins fathered by Rafael). Jane and Michael eventually get married, with Rafael deciding to not confess his undying love for Jane. Just before the couple plans to have sex, Michael is shot.

Michael survives and Jane finally loses her virginity. The two enjoy married life for a while until Michael apparently drops dead due to delayed side effects of the gunshot. The series then skips three years into the future. Jane has moved back in with Alba. She's the assistant to a publisher, has Saturday brunches with Rafael, Petra, and the kids, and is writing a book about her love story with Michael. Jane decides it's time to have her first fling, which leads her into a brief relationship with Rogelio's co-star, Fabian. Jane eventually realizes she still has feelings for Rafael. As Jane goes to Rafael to confess her feelings, she runs into Adam, her first love.

Jane pursues a relationship with Adam, against the wishes of both her grandmother and mother. In the meantime, Jane finally publishes her book about her relationship with Michael, which doesn't sell as well as she had hoped. Soon after, Adam breaks up with her to take a job in California. Jane goes on a book tour, heartbroken, but when she returns home she shares a kiss with Rafael, re-opening the possibility of the two being together.

The two eventually get back together, but break up in the fifth season after Michael is revealed to be alive. Jane and Michael eventually break up. Jane attempts to reconcile with Rafael, but Rafael initially wants nothing to do with her. It's only when Mateo is diagnosed with ADHD that they reconcile as friends. They eventually get back together, with Rafael proposing to Jane shortly after. Jane and Rafael marry in the series finale.

Xiomara Villanueva
Xiomara Gloriana De La Vega (née Villanueva) (portrayed by Andrea Navedo) is Jane's laid back mother, and Alba's daughter. Unlike her mother and daughter, Xiomara is accustomed to looser morals, losing her virginity at a young age and having Jane at 16. She and Jane's father, Rogelio De La Vega, were high school sweethearts until he moved away, and she chose to not tell him about the pregnancy. For years it was just herself, Jane, and Alba, but one day she learned Rogelio had become a famous telenovela star, and so she finally reaches out to him. Xiomara keeps Rogelio a secret from Jane at first, but eventually he's allowed into his daughter's life and the two begin to bond. In the meantime, Xiomara and Rogelio start to develop feelings for one another again, and they have an on and off relationship throughout the first two seasons of the show. After Alba is pushed down the stairs and put in the hospital, Xiomara makes a vow to God to not have sex again until she's married, which Alba wakes up early to hear, and so she pretends otherwise. Xiomara is eventually released from this vow. Xiomara aspires to be a singer, and so she usually performs shows at different night clubs. In the first season's finale, Rogelio brings Xiomara with him to perform in Las Vegas, but they have to go back early for the birth of Jane's son, Mateo. Before this, however, the two get drunkenly married.

The marriage is soon annulled, though Xiomara continues to pursue her relationship with Rogelio anyway. She's supportive of Jane as a new mother, but her relationship with Rogelio begins to deteriorate when they themselves discuss the possibility of having more kids. While Rogelio wants a baby, having missed out on the first twenty years of Jane's life, Xiomara has no desire. Though Rogelio agrees to give up the dream at first, Xiomara breaks up with him, refusing to be the reason he can't have children. The two remain on good terms after this, but Xiomara ends up having a casual relationship with Rogelio's costar Esteban. In the season finale, Xiomara and Rogelio share a dance at Jane and Michael's wedding, but afterwards she takes a pregnancy test and learns that she's pregnant with Esteban's child.

Xiomara winds up having an abortion, causing a temporary rift in her relationship with Alba, but the two quickly patch things up. Xiomara starts to give up on her dream of becoming a performer, deciding to look into getting a normal job. She briefly works as a bank teller. Eventually, however, Rogelio helps her open up a dance studio. This just so happens to be next to where Bruce works, a married man she used to sleep with, who's since gotten a divorce from his wife. Xiomara and Bruce pursue a relationship, with the eventual blessing of Jane and Tess, Bruce's daughter. Xiomara moves in with Bruce, and the two live together for three years. During this time, Xiomara has had a falling out with Rogelio because of the way she was depicted in his reality show. When the two finally make up though, their feelings return, and Bruce breaks up with Xiomara. She gets back together with Rogelio, who admits that, with Mateo, he no longer feels a void in not having his own baby. Xiomara and Rogelio get engaged and are set to be married in the third season's finale. They have Jane perform the ceremony, despite now dealing with the fact that Rogelio will in fact be having a child with his ex-girlfriend, Darci.

In the fourth season, Xiomara and Rogelio deal with Darci and eventually her daughter, which she and Rogelio decide to name "Baby". The couple has a brief falling out when Xiomara learns that Rogelio had always suspected there was a chance Jane might have existed, but the two patch things up and decide to go into therapy.

Midway through the fourth season, Xo is diagnosed with Stage III breast cancer, however fights through it and eventually becomes cancer-free in the fifth season. This inspires her to enroll into nursing school to become a nurse, and in the series finale, she moves with Rogelio to New York.

Petra Solano
Petra Solano, born Natalia Anděl (portrayed by Yael Grobglas) is from the Czech Republic, running away and taking on a new identity with her mother, Magda, in order to hide from her abusive boyfriend, Miloš. Petra becomes engaged to Lachlan Moore before leaving him for Rafael Solano, a man with slightly more money, but ultimately falling in love with him. The two get married and Petra becomes pregnant, but they eventually lose the baby and Rafael becomes diagnosed with cancer. Their marriage falls apart after this, though Rafael beats his cancer, and so Petra plots to inseminate herself with his sperm sample as a way of preventing him from leaving her. This fails, as the sample is inseminated in Jane Villanueva instead, and so she concocts a line of other schemes to keep him within her grasp. These all fail, and the couple get divorced, but Petra remains a thorn in Rafael's side. Miloš tracks down Petra and Magda, sending his goon, Ivan, but the two ladies hold him hostage for a period of time before he escapes. Petra also deals with the repercussions of her affair with Roman Zazo, whose twin brother Aaron is around; however, Aaron turns out to be Roman, and Petra winds up killing him once he takes her hostage. Petra takes a share of the Marbella, preventing herself from being forced out, and in the season finale it's discovered Rafael has another sperm sample leftover. Petra has just learned that Rafael is trying to manipulate her in hopes of getting rid of her, and so, rather than telling him about the sample, she steals it for herself.

Despite initial debate, Petra inseminates herself via a turkey baster, putting her in a position of being in Rafael's life forever. The two are forced to put aside differences and work together through this pregnancy. Though, due to Petra being alone for the most part, she works to get Magda out of jail for pushing Alba down the stairs. Miloš also returns again, forcing Petra to marry him, but he flees the country after his illegal operations are exposed. The two are presumably divorced. Petra works on bettering her relationship with Jane, but this is halted when Magda kills Ivan and the two are forced to bury the body. Magda sells Petra out to the police, giving her full blame, but Rafael helps Petra turn things around and get Magda re-incarcerated. Petra gives birth in the fourteenth episode of the season with Jane by her side, delivering twin girls that she and Rafael name "Anna" and "Elsa", Jane being the only one to pick up on the reference. Petra begins to suffer from postpartum depression, not knowing how to be a mother, and she considers running away. She backs out of this at the last minute though, just in time for her twin sister Anežka to show up at her door. Petra takes Anežka in, learning Magda kept Petra over Anežka because she was the "prettier one". Petra embraces having a sister because it means having her own little family, but it turns out that Anežka has been working with Magda all along. In the finale, Anežka injects Petra with something that paralyzes her, and she takes her place, going on to have sex with Rafael.

Petra remains paralyzed as Anežka masquerades as her, entering into a relationship with Scott while planning to steal Rafael's money to get Magda out of jail and flee. However, Jane and Rafael begin to suspect something's up, though it takes a couple months, and Petra becomes un-paralyzed. She tattoos NOT PETRA onto her sister's forehead and allows her to cut bangs, then deciding to keep up Anežka's scheme to steal Rafael's hotel shares due to him not realizing she was paralyzed. As it turns out Petra is beginning to suffer from PTSD, but she eventually hands Rafael's shares back and he gets her the help she needs. When he decides to turn himself in for insider trading, Petra is left to care for their daughters, and finally gets the hang of being a mother. Three years pass, and Petra has two very well-behaved daughters and has re-branded the Marbella into a kids hotel. She begins seeing rival hotel owner Chuck Chesser, and scandal strikes the Marbella again when Scott's bones are found on the shore. Rafael develops feelings for Petra again, and she struggles between choosing between him and Chuck. She chooses Rafael but backs down when realizing he'll never be truly over Jane. In the finale, she finds herself held at gunpoint by Anežka.

Petra wrestles the gun from Anežka and survives, but trouble still brews when Rafael's sister Luisa takes his shares of the hotel. Along with that, Magda gets out of jail, and she and Anežka work with Luisa against Petra and Rafael. Petra ends all romantic ties with Rafael, but the two work together to get the hotel back. When Anežka gains control of the Marbella after convincing Luisa she's insane, checking herself into a mental hospital, Petra realizes it was all a set-up. Anežka goes to push Petra off the balcony of the Marbella to keep her quiet, but winds up the one to fall and die instead. Afterwards, Petra hires lawyer Jane Ramos to defend her, but they end up liking each other and start dating and by the end of the show they are still together.

Rafael Solano
Rafael Solano (portrayed by Justin Baldoni) is a former playboy and owner of the Marbella. After a few good years of marriage to Petra, a miscarriage and cancer take a toll, and the couple begins to fall apart. With Rafael plotting to leave her, Petra decides to artificially inseminate herself with his sperm sample, only for his sister, Luisa, to accidentally inseminate the wrong woman. This woman happens to be Jane Villanueva, a girl with whom he shared a passionate kiss with years before and never called back. Rafael breaks things off with Petra once learning she had an affair with his now supposedly deceased best friend, Roman Zazo, and he and Jane pursue a relationship when she and her fiancé Michael break up. Things start out well enough for Jane and Rafael, but the relationship starts to fall apart as Rafael's life begins to unravel. The two remain on good terms though, and welcome their newborn son into the world in the season finale. Meanwhile, Petra learns that Rafael has another sperm sample which she steals for herself, and Rafael's son, Mateo, is kidnapped by his stepmother Rose/crime lord Sin Rostro.

Rafael works with Jane and Michael to rescue Mateo, and he and Jane embrace co-parenting their newborn. Meanwhile, Rafael also learns that Petra's pregnant as well, thus forever intertwining their lives. Rafael supports both women, though his hopes of rebuilding a romantic relationship with Jane fall through when she learns he got Michael fired. Rafael helps Petra when she gets in trouble with the law, helping her mother cover up a murder, and remains by her side throughout the rest of her pregnancy. In the fourteenth episode of the second season, the two welcome twin daughters Anna and Elsa Solano. Rafael struggles with family drama as well though, for he learns that his mother is Rose's rival, a crime lord by the name of Mutter. He also meets his half-brother Derek who gets him into some trouble with insider trading. Rose is supposedly killed, and his mother is arrested, but all is not well as he watches Jane get back together with Michael, the two deciding to finally get married. He stands by, choosing to not confess his undying love to Jane on her wedding day. Unbeknownst to him, however, Petra's twin sister Anežka paralyzes her and takes her place. She then seduces Rafael as Petra, despite him making clear that his heart still belongs to Jane.

After Michael is shot, word quickly gets out that Rose is in fact alive. She has Rafael's mother killed with only a Bible left behind for him. He begins to investigate it, all the while deciding he no longer has feelings for Jane. This allows the two to have a healthy friendship while also meaning Rafael can stand up for himself when he disagrees with any of Jane's parenting choices. As he continues to dig into his past, he soon learns that he was in fact adopted and that he is not a Solano. After Petra becomes de-paralyzed, she begins to spiral, but Rafael gets her help. He decides to turn himself in for insider trading, leaving Petra to care for their kids. Three years later, he's out of jail and the Marbella has been rebranded a kids hotel. Rafael is dating Abbey and platonically co-parenting with Jane and Petra, but he soon breaks things off with Abbey and realizes he has feelings for Petra again. He pursues her, but Petra ultimately decides against taking back because he'll never truly be over Jane. Meanwhile, Rafael works with the police to get Luisa and Rose back into town where Rose is arrested. Luisa falls out with Rafael and then learns from Anežka the truth about her supposed brother not being a Solano after all. Rafael finds himself kicked out of the Marbella with Luisa claiming what's rightfully hers.

Now with no money, Rafael moves in with the Villanuevas. After making one final attempt at a relationship with Petra, the two end things for good and focus on getting the Marbella back. Rafael begins to spiral though, becoming the person that he once was, until Jane finally manages to get through to him. Once her relationship with Adam ends and she returns from her book tour, the two share a kiss, re-opening the possibility of them being an item again.

The two get back together, with Rafael revealing to Jane's family that he had planned of proposing to her. However, his plan is foiled after Michael returns, never having really died. They try to stay together, but Rafael eventually breaks up with Jane, and he attempts to avoid her at all costs. When Mateo is diagnosed with ADHD, he and Jane become friends again and work together to help him. They eventually reconcile, and Rafael proposes to Jane, who accepts his proposal. Rafael and Jane originally planned a small and quick wedding, but they later decide to have a much larger wedding. They later become husband and wife in the series finale.

Alba Villanueva
Alba Gloriana Villanueva (portrayed by Ivonne Coll) is the deeply religious mother of Xiomara's and grandmother of Jane. Emigrating from Venezuela at a young age, she and her husband Mateo established lives for themselves and the generations to come. When Jane is ten years old, Alba makes her vow to save herself until marriage, a vow that Jane keeps. Alba often acts as the voice of reason in the Villanueva household, recognized as wise and looked up to as such. She supports Jane when she finds herself accidentally artificially inseminated, and makes it no secret that she supports Jane being with Rafael. However, she's very accepting of Michael during the time Jane is with him. Alba does not always get along with Xiomara due to her loose morals, but at the end of the day the mother and daughter find themselves making amends, with or without Jane's help. Alba, like her daughter and granddaughter, has a love for grilled cheese sandwiches and telenovelas. She's a fan of Rogelio De La Vega, and is very welcoming of him into the family when it gets out that he's Jane's biological father.

Alba is pushed down the stairs at the Marbella by Petra's mother, Magda, and ends up in a temporary coma. At this time, Xiomara makes a vow to God to not have sex again until she's married. Alba wakes up during this but pretends to be asleep until the vow is finished. Xiomara keeps this up for a while, but Alba eventually releases her from it. In the second season, it's discovered that Alba actually lost her virginity before marriage to a man named Pablo Alonso Segura. Jane and Xiomara invite Pablo to Miami despite Alba's pleas for them not to, deeming him to be bad luck. Still, Alba gives Pablo a chance, and the two wind up sharing a tango together as the Villanueva house floods. Alba soon learns Pablo is cheating on her though and so she breaks things off. During the second season, Alba also has a brief relationship with a priest, but it's presumably ended since then. Despite being deeply religious, Alba proves to be a very open-minded person, having read up on LGBT activism as well as accepting when Xiomara decides to have an abortion.

After years of being in the United States illegally, Alba finally decides to apply for a greencard and gets approved. After this, she gets a job in the gift shop at the Marbella. There, she meets Jorge, a co-worker who she develops a crush for. After three years, Jorge finally gets out of a relationship and Alba decides to make her move. The two begin seeing one another, and Alba promises to keep his immigration status secret when learning he's in the country illegally. In the fourth season, Jorge proposes marriage to Alba, but she rejects him, but they remain on good terms. Shortly after becoming a US citizen, Alba finds out that Jorge's mother is terminally ill, and she marries him illegally so he can get his green card to visit her in Mexico. In the 5th season, they eventually rediscover their feelings for one another and get married for real.

Michael Cordero, Jr.
Jane's boyfriend at the beginning of the series. Michael is initially the head detective in the hunt for Sin Rostro, a high-profile drug dealer who seems to be based in the Marbella Hotel. He later quits his job to become a lawyer.

Initially reluctant to raise a baby with Jane, he blackmails Petra with knowledge of her affair in Season 1, in the hopes that Jane will not keep the baby if Petra's marriage to Rafael remains intact. He later changes his mind and agrees to be part of the baby's upbringing. 

Jane and Michael get married in the season two finale. Following their marriage, they live together in a house that Petra pays for half of without their knowledge. When Petra stops paying, they are unable to pay the full amount and move out into a smaller house with Mateo.

In season three, Michael is presumed dead from an aortic dissection caused by a gunshot at his wedding to Jane. However, in the season 4 finale, he is discovered to be living in Montana under the name Jason, having lost his memory due to electroshock following the attack.

After Michael returns to Miami, Jane attempts to get his memory back despite being in a relationship with Rafael. Following many failed attempts to do so, Michael/Jason decided he wants to go back to Montana; however, when he leaves Jane's house after telling her goodbye, his memory suddenly returns. Michael and Jane date again and even go back to Montana together. After a weekend, Michael wants to try for real with Jane, but Jane discovers that she feels guilty for Rafael but still loves Michael/Jason. Jane tearfully tells Michael that she loves him, but it has been too long, and she is now really in love with Rafael. Michael stays in Montana and Jane returns home. He comes back during the penultimate episode with a heavily pregnant fiancé (played by Dier's real life ex-fiancé, Haley Lu Richardson) to discuss being a part of Jane's new book. He and Jane part ways amicably.

Rogelio De La Vega
A self-involved, famous telenovela star and Jane's biological father. He is trying to gain a relationship with his newly discovered daughter. He also has feelings for Xiomara, who was his girlfriend in high school. He marries Xiomara in the season three finale. In season 5 he finally achieves his dream of being an American star, and begins filming This is Mars, a remake of The Passions of Santos. He later moves to New York with Xiomara after his co-star, River Fields, moves the show there.

Mateo Gloriano Rogelio Solano Villanueva
Jane and Rafael's child. Named after Jane's grandfather and Alba's husband, who died before Jane was born. During the fifth season, Mateo is diagnosed with attention-deficit-hyperactivity-disorder (ADHD). Mateo was kidnapped by Rose Solano. It was revealed in "Chapter One Hundred" that his adult counterpart served as the main narrator throughout the series.

Recurring characters

Overview

Notes

Introduced in season one

Luisa Alver
Luisa Alver (portrayed by Yara Martinez) is the doctor who artificially inseminated Jane, as well as Rafael's sister. She's an alcoholic and in love with her stepmother, Rose. The two have an on and off relationship before spending three years together until Rose is found and arrested. Luisa eventually begins working with the police to end Rose's reign of terror, and eventually pushes the latter to her death in the penultimate episode, and also reconciles with Rafael and Jane.

Rose Solano
Rose Solano (portrayed by Bridget Regan) is a crime lord who falls in love with Luisa, and the main antagonist of the series. She kills Emilio, kidnaps Mateo, and shoots Michael. After three years on the run with Luisa, she's arrested. In the 5th season, she escapes and takes Jane hostage, however, ultimately falls to her death after being double-crossed by Luisa.
 Susanna Barnett (Megan Ketch, season 2): Rose's fake identity, acting as Michael's new partner after Nadine is killed.
 Eileen (Elisabeth Röhm, season 3 & 5): Rose's second fake identity that she uses for a total of three years in order to be with Luisa.

Regan's casting was announced in August 2014. Rohm's casting was announced in November 2016.

Emilio Solano
Emilio Solano (portrayed by Carlo Rota, season 1) is Rafael's adoptive father and Luisa's biological father. Always disappointed in Rafael, he owns the Marbella and was married to Rose before she drowned him in cement.

Magda Anděl
Magda Anděl (portrayed by Priscilla Barnes) is Petra's scheming mother who fakes paralysis. She pushes Alba down a flight of stairs and kills Ivan, winding up arrested on both occasions. She later uses her other daughter Anežka to get revenge against Petra, though this doesn't go as planned. She's released from prison in the fourth season for unknown reasons. In Season 5, she loses her leg in a car crash, and moves to Siberia, but not before telling Petra she has a triplet sibling. Petra does not believe Magda, but it is revealed Magda was telling the truth, and Petra has a triplet brother named Pyotr.

Lina Santillan
Lina Santillan (portrayed by Diane Guerrero) is Jane's best friend and co-worker at the Marbella. Despite Lina having moved to New York and having married someone, the two remain close, and Lina serves as the maid of honor at both of Jane's weddings. She reveals that she is pregnant in the series finale.

Nadine Hanson
Nadine Hanson (portrayed by Azie Tesfai, seasons 1–2) is Michael's partner who turns out to be working for Sin Rostro. She's shot dead in the second season.

Tesfai's casting was announced in August 2014.

Frankie and Luca
Frankie (portrayed by Camille Collard, season 1) and Luca (portrayed by Brian Dare, seasons 1, 2, 4) are Jane's friends who worked at the Marbella. Jane and Frankie have a falling out when Frankie gets fired and Jane does nothing to stop it. They've yet to make up. Luca is homosexual.

Lachlan Moore
Lachlan Moore (portrayed by Michael Rady, seasons 1–2) is Rafael's rival and Petra's former fiancé. She leaves Lachlan for Rafael.

Rady's casting was announced in August 2014.

Roman and Aaron Zazo
Roman and Aaron Zazo (portrayed by Alano Miller, seasons 1 and 4)

Roman was Rafael's friend who was having an affair with Petra. He later faked his death by killing his twin brother, Aaron, who he pretended was him. When later pursuing Petra, she kills him in self-defense.

Ivan Rogachevsky
Ivan Rogachevsky (portrayed by Chris Corbin, seasons 1–2) is Miloš' goon hired to track down Petra and Magda. He comes after them on more than one instance, and Magda ends up slitting his throat with her hook.

Miloš Dvořáček
Miloš Dvořáček (portrayed by Max Bird-Ridnell, seasons 1, 2 and 5) is Petra's abusive boyfriend from the Czech Republic. Petra and her mother flee the country with new identities to get away from him. He later tracks Petra down, and Petra even marries him for a short time before he's sent away. He comes back in the 5th season attempting to harm Petra, but is stopped by JR, who he has been blackmailing to get Petra sent to jail. He reveals that Luisa had unknowingly given him two-thirds of the Marbella, but is double-crossed by Krishna, who gives the shares back to Petra, and he is sent to prison for good.

Scott Archuletta
Scott Archuletta (portrayed by Wes Armstrong, seasons 1-3) is the Marbella's sleazy lounge manager. He keeps a burnbook on the Marbella, and eventually marries Anežka. During the three-year time jump he winds up dead, killed by Eileen. He also was known for the vests he wore.

Esteban Santiago
Esteban Santiago (portrayed by Keller Wortham, seasons 1–2, 4-5) is Rogelio's acting rival. He has a fling with Xiomara, who gets pregnant and secretly decides to get an abortion. He's in a relationship with Rogelio's other babymama, Darci. He proposes to Darci, and they get engaged in the series finale.

Dina Milagro
Dina Milagro (portrayed by Judy Reyes, seasons 1–3, 5) is the head writer of The Passions of Santos. She briefly dates Rogelio and later returns as the head writer of This Is Mars.

Elena Di Nola
Elena Di Nola (Fabiana Udenio, seasons 1–3): Emilio's second wife and Rafael's adoptive mother, she's a crime lord that rivals Rose. After serving as a threat to Rafael, she winds up imprisoned and later killed by Rose.

Regina
Regina (Layla Alizada, seasons 1 and 4) is Jane's friend and co-worker at the Marbella. She has two kids, with Jane teaching one of them how to make a grilled cheese sandwich. In season 1, Jane was at a crossroads after finding out Rafael was going to fire either Frankie or Regina, and she could save only one of them, and she ultimately chose Regina. She eventually takes over Jane's job as lounge manager when Jane leaves after ghostwriting Petra's lifestyle book.

Introduced in season two

Krishna Dhawan
Krishna Dhawan (portrayed by Shelly Bhalla, seasons 2–5) is Petra's (formerly Rafael's) assistant. In the third season it's revealed she's gay. She is incarcerated in season 4, believed to be JR's blackmailer, however, is released after it is revealed this is not true. In season 5 she becomes Petra's assistant again, and assists her in retrieving two-thirds of the Marbella from Miloš, the real blackmailer.

Mateo Villanueva
Mateo Villanueva (portrayed by Dennis Mencia, seasons 2 and 4) is Alba's late husband, Xiomara's father, and Jane's grandfather.

Jonathan Chavez
Jonathan Chavez (portrayed by Adam Rodriguez, seasons 2 and 4): Jane's mentor who she has a brief relationship with. When choosing to not have sex with him, they break things off and agree that it's best they cut ties all together.

Anna and Ellie Solano
Anna & Ellie Solano (portrayed by uncredited baby actors, seasons 2–3; Mia and Ella Allan, seasons 3–5) are Petra and Rafael's twin daughters. Unlike their half-brother, they grow up to be well behaved with good manners.

Anežka Archuletta
Anežka Archuletta (portrayed by Yael Grobglas, seasons 2–4) is Petra's long lost twin sister who paralyzes Petra and steals her identity. She also marries Scott and continues to scheme against Petra following his death. She ends up being flung from Petra's balcony and to her death in the mid-season finale of the fourth season.

Derek Ruvelle
Derek Ruvelle (portrayed by Mat Vairo, season 2): Elena's son who was at one point believed to be Rafael's half-brother. He was supposedly killed by Rose.

Rudy
Rudy (portrayed by Rudy Martinez) is Rogelio's personal assistant. In season 5 he is revealed to have a gluten allergy.

Patricia Cordero
Patricia Cordero (portrayed by Molly Hagan, seasons 2–5): Michael's mother who has a poor relationship with Jane.

Marlene Donaldson
Marlene Donaldson (portrayed by Melanie Mayron, seasons 2–5) is Jane's mentor when looking to become a writer.

Introduced in season three

Dennis Chambers
Dennis Chambers (portrayed by Christopher Allen) is Michael's best friend and the detective in charge of investigating Scott's death. He and Jane begin spending time together after Michael dies, but they fall out when Jane realizes he's using her to get to Michael's case files. The two eventually make amends, Dennis teaching Jane boxing as a mean of letting out her anger. The two also go on a date, but realize there are no sparks, and so nothing becomes of it.

Jorge Garcia
Jorge (portrayed by Alfonso DiLuca) is Alba's co-worker at the Marbella giftshop. The two enter into a relationship after Alba spends three years having a crush on him. During the span of their relationship, Alba learns that Jorge is an undocumented citizen and agrees to keep it a secret. The relationship ends once Alba rejects Jorge's marriage proposal, and so he reconciles with his ex. He and Alba get married in the season 4 finale so that Jorge can visit his ill mother in Mexico. They eventually fall in love again and get married for real in Season 5.

Bruce
Bruce (portrayed by Ricardo Chavira) is a married man Xiomara used to have an affair with. When he finally gets a divorce, he and Xiomara enter into a relationship, but the couple is met with disapproval by both Xo's daughter Jane and Bruce's daughter Tess. Both eventually give their blessing, however, and Xo and Bruce date for the next three years, even moving in with one another. They briefly get engaged, but Bruce ends things with Xo when realizing she still has feelings for Rogelio.

Chavira's casting was announced in September 2016.

Catalina Maria Mora
Catalina Maria Mora (portrayed by Sofia Pernas): Jane's opportunist cousin who has a brief fling with Rafael.

Darci Factor
Darci Factor (portrayed by Justina Machado) is a matchmaker who Rogelio meets with in order to have a child. The two end up falling for one another, entering into a relationship and starring in a reality show together, but three years pass, and it's revealed they have broken up. As it turns out, Rogelio backed out of having a child with Darci after she had already unfrozen her eggs. The two now despise one another as their show comes to an end, and they part ways on bad terms. However, Darci returns months later, eight months pregnant with Rogelio's child, as they were secretly having hate sex during the final months of filming their show. Darci goes on to have a daughter, and she and Rogelio agree to raise the baby together, naming her Baby Michaelina De La Vega Factor. Darci is dating Rogelio's arch-rival, Esteban Santiago. In the series finale, she and Esteban get engaged while taking pictures for Jane and Rafael's wedding.

Machado's casting was announced in October 2016.

Chuck Chesser
Chuck Chesser (portrayed by Johnny Messner) is the Fairwick Hotel's newest owner who has a longterm feud with Petra. The two have a no-strings-attached sexual relationship for six months before eventually deciding to be a couple, but drama follows when it becomes known that Petra pushed the late Scott's bones onto the Fairwick Hotel's property and when it turns out Scott and Chuck secretly knew one another. Despite this, Petra and Chuck prevail, but the relationship fully falls through when Petra rediscovers her feelings for Rafael and chooses to be with him over Chuck. This also falls through though, and Petra decides she needs a fresh start when it comes to love altogether.

Messner's casting was announced January 2017. Showrunner Jennie Urman later confirmed "Petra has a terrific love interest in the back half of the [third] season that we're all very excited about." This alluded to Messner's role in the series.

Fabian Regalo del Cielo 
Fabian Regalo del Cielo (Francisco San Martin) is Rogelio's telenovela costar who Jane has her first fling with. The relationship becomes complicated when Fabian finds himself wanting more from Jane, but Jane does not reciprocate. When the two finally end things, this results in Fabian having a falling out with Rogelio, resulting in on-set drama and Rogelio getting Fabian's character on their telenovela killed off.

Adam Alvaro
Adam Alvaro (portrayed by Tyler Posey) is Jane's first love who she almost married after high school. The two get back together after Adam delivers Jane a letter, he found that was addressed to her from her late husband, Michael. During the course of their relationship, Adam designs the cover of Jane's book, gets to know her son Mateo, and gives Jane a lesson on what it means to be bisexual. Their relationship comes to a sudden end when Adam leaves Jane for a job out in California, much to her dismay.

Posey's casting was announced in April 2017. Series lead Gina Rodriguez and the costume designer pitched the idea to showrunner Jennie Snyder Urman, who immediately offered Posey the role. There was a brief moment where they thought they lost Posey to another project.

Introduced in season four

Baby Michaelina De La Vega Factor
Baby Michaelina De La Vega Factor (portrayed by uncredited baby actors) is Rogelio and Darci's daughter, conceived during the production of The De La Vega Factor Factor. Darci reveals the pregnancy to Rogelio shortly before his wedding to Xiomara, and the two spend the remainder of the pregnancy fighting with one another for rights to their unborn child. Darci gives birth in Rogelio and Xiomara's house, and they settle on the name "Baby Michaelina" after Rogelio's best friend Michael.

Jane Ramos
Jane "JR" Ramos (portrayed by Rosario Dawson) is Petra's attorney following Anežka's death. Though seemingly a friend to Petra, it turns out she was being blackmailed to help frame Petra for murder, the life of her mother being at stake. Petra and JR eventually develop romantic feelings for one another and enter into a relationship once Petra's blackmailer, Krishna, is exposed. It is revealed that Petra did kill her sister, causing JR to be fired from her job, and they break up, but JR comes to Petra's rescue after Miloš, the real blackmailer, breaks into Petra's house. They eventually reconcile, but break up again when JR takes a job in Houston. However, during Jane and Rafael's wedding, JR shows up, and they get back together once again.

Dawson's casting was announced January 2018.

River Fields
River Fields (portrayed by Brooke Shields) is a beloved American actress and advocate for awareness of postpartum depression, who takes issue after Rogelio speaks on men suffering PPD. They schedule an interview on The Talk in order to debate the subject, but this goes awry when River is attacked by a wolf from the endangered species segment. Despite this incident, American producers fall in love with River and Rogelio's chemistry and offer to let Rogelio recreate his telenovela if he convinces River to be his love interest. River signs on to the project, titled The Passions of Steve and Brenda, but only after she's satisfied with the development and expansion of her character. Rogelio unintentionally causing River severe harm becomes a running gag, as he causes her to lose one of her toes, burns off her eyebrows, and temporarily paralyzes half of her face all within the time they spend together.

River and Rogelio shoot the pilot, but the network decides to not pick it up because they want something edgier with a science fiction undertone and a younger cast. The script is re-written and renamed This Is Mars with the storyline spreading across two generations, River and Rogelio playing the older version of their characters. When Xiomara learns that she is cancer-free, River takes this to mean that she and Rogelio, who she's been in love with the entire time, can finally be together. Despite being turned down, River continues to make advances which results in conflict with Xiomara. Finally accepting Rogelio's rejection, River decides that the best form of revenge is to do nothing, allowing for Rogelio's paranoia to get to him until she decides that they are even. In the process, River becomes romantically involved with Rogelio's new bodyguard. River starts to reevaluate her life when the pilot receives a series order and considers rejecting the offer in favor of her estranged daughter, Pond. Rogelio assists in making amends with Pond, but River moves production of the series to New York, as permitted within her contract.

Shields' casting was announced in January 2018. The character of River Fields is a spoof of the actress and while they are "equally smart, witty, and gorgeous," the network insists that the character is "vastly different" from Shields.

Introduced in season five

Bobby
Bobby (portrayed by Tommy Dorfman) is an associate of Sin Rostro, initially sent to Miami to keep an eye on Luisa. Luisa comes to rely on Bobby as a confidant, and he convinces her to ask Rafael to finally introduce her to Mateo. All the while, Bobby has been spying on Rafael and later breaks into his apartment. Rose confesses to Luisa that she sent Bobby to look after her, and after being turned away by Rafael, Luisa approaches Bobby expressing desire to follow Rose's orders. Bobby works with Luisa to obtain the code to Rafael's safe, later allowing for them to break in and steal a watch with a hidden compartment containing Emilio Solano's fingerprint. This grants them access to a vault with stacks of cash. Rose finally initiates her escape plan from prison, and Bobby retrieves Luisa to meet her. When it turns out Luisa has been working with the police, Bobby is fatally shot when Rose uses him as a shield to avoid being detained once more.

Dorfman's casting was announced in September 2018.

Minor characters
Billy Cordero (Ryan Devlin, season 1): Michael's shady brother.
Valeria and Victoria (Vanessa Merrell and Veronica Merrell, seasons 1-2): are Rogelio's former stepdaughters who serve as thorns in Jane's side.
Liliana De La Vega (Rita Moreno, seasons 1-2, 5): Rogelio's mother who disapproves of Xiomara.
Andie (Rachel DiPillo): once Jane's friend, she later dates Michael.
Sister Margaret (Leslie Simms) and Sister Theresa (Willow Geer): nuns who work at the school Jane teaches at.
Juicy Jordan (Vanessa Vander Pluym): Luisa's girlfriend who breaks up with her for not being over Rose.
Manuel De La Vega (Cástulo Guerra, season 2): Rogelio's father who comes out as a homosexual.
Paola/Lola (Ana de la Reguera, season 2): once Rogelio's prison pen pal, she gets out of jail and becomes his assistant before kidnapping him. She plans to stream their live suicide, but Michael defeats her and saves Rogelio before this can occur.
Wesley Masters (Brian Jordan Alvarez): one Jane's classmates who betrays her trust and writes a scandalous piece on the Solanos. 
Pablo Alonso Segura (Marcelo Tubert; season 2): the man Alba lost her virginity to who's known to be bad luck.
Chloe Leland (Maya Kazan): a publisher that Jane worked for.
Eileen (Elisabeth Röhm, seasons 3 and 5): a woman whose identity and face Rose uses in order to be with Luisa in front of her family. One night, when a drunken Scott recognizes Eileen after having seen Rose disguised as her, Eileen kills him in order to prevent him from figuring anything out. She buries him in a ditch on the Marbella's beach and is never seen or heard from again.
Abbey Whitman (Minka Kelly; season 3): Rafael's girlfriend of two years who runs a greeting card company. The two move in together, but the relationship falls through when Rafael finds himself unable to fully commit, and also rediscovers his feelings for Petra.
Alex (Deniz Akdeniz; season 3): Mateo's aide at preschool who Jane later mistakes as being flirty with her rather than just friendly.
Katherine Cortes (Alex Meneses; season 4): a Miami socialite who Rafael has a fling with during his plan to take back the Marbella.
Anton/Carl (Graham Sibley, season 4): an actor hired by Anežka and Magda to gaslight Luisa.
 Jeremy Howe (Evan Todd): Jane's bro-ish editor for her first book
Pammy the Parrot (Katie Michels): the mascott at the Marbella.
Pond Juniper Fields (Eden Sher) is River's estranged daughter and personal assistant.
Lily Lofton (Emmy Raver-Lampman) is Jane's book editor who helps her publish her second novel.

References 

Lists of American comedy-drama television series characters
Lists of romance television characters